Thomas Wallgren, Professor (born 28 February 1958) is a Swedish-speaking Finnish philosopher, activist and politician. He studied philosophy at the University of Helsinki and where he is a lecturer and docent. 

He was active in the Koijärvi Movement in the 1980s, and opposed Finnish membership of the European Union. 
In 2015 he signed citizens' initiative of centre-right Keskusta politician Paavo Väyrynen to hold a referendum on Finland's membership of the euro area. He has written about his doubts about the validity of the EU as a postwar "project of peace", arguing furthermore that the EU today suffers from a “democracy deficit”.

Wallgren first came to public attention through his "environmental stunts", which included buying shares in large Finnish corporations, such as Nokia, only for the purpose of gaining the right to speak at their shareholders' conferences, where he would then raise the issue of the company's lack of environmentalism. 

In 2008, he was elected to the Helsinki City Council as a Social Democrat (SDP), representing its centrist wing. In 2012, he was reelected. He stood as a candidate in the 2019 general election for the SDP but was not elected.

Selection of Wallgren books in English
"Transformative Philosophy. Socrates, Wittgenstein, and the democratic spirit of philosophy", Lexington Books, 2005.
"Challenge of philosophy: Beyond contemplation and critical theory", 1996.
"Commonality and particularity in ethics", edited with Lilli Alanen and Sara Heinämaa, Macmillan, 1997.

Articles by Wallgren in English
"Georg Henrik von Wright: a Memorial Notice". Philosophical Investigations, 28: 1–13, 2005.

References

1958 births
Living people
Swedish-speaking Finns
Social Democratic Party of Finland politicians
Politics of Helsinki
University of Helsinki alumni